This is a list of topics related to Morocco. You can also visit Moroccan portal.

Art

Architecture
 Moroccan architecture
 Riad
 Tadelakt
 Zellij

Cinematography
 Ali Zaoua: Prince of the Streets
 Casablanca (film)
 Marock
 Morocco (1930 Movie)
 List of foreign films shot in Morocco

Dance

Festivals
 Festival of Amazigh Film
 Gnaoua World Music Festival
 Tanjazz
 World Sacred Music Festival

Literature

 List of Moroccan writers

Painting
 Chaïbia Talal
 Mohamed Hamri

Music

 Andalusian classical music
 Andalusi nubah
 Bachir Attar
 Bendir
 Berber music
 Chaabi
 Gnawa music
 Guembri
 Jil Jilala
 Krakebs
 Malhun
 Master Musicians of Jajouka
 Master Musicians of Jajouka featuring Bachir Attar
 Master Musicians of Joujouka
 Morocco in the Eurovision Song Contest
 Nass El Ghiwane
 Nass Marrakech
 Sephardic music

Sculpture

Communications

 .ma
 ISOC Morocco
 Maroc Telecom
 Méditel
 Menara, Maroc Telecom
 Ministry of Communications of Morocco

 ONPT
 List of postal codes in Morocco
 British post offices in Morocco
 Postal history of Morocco
 List of fish on stamps of Morocco

Culture

 Djemaa el Fna
 Forbes Museum of Tangier
 Marrakech Museum

Demography

 Beni Hassan
 Beni Ouriaghel
 Berber people
 Chleuh
 Sahrawi

Economy

 Attijariwafa Bank
 Bank Al-Maghrib
 BMCE Bank
 BMCI
 Banque Commerciale du Maroc
 Casablanca Stock Exchange

 List of Moroccan companies
 MADEX index
 MASI index
 Wana
 Moroccan dirham
 Moroccan franc

 US-Morocco Free Trade Agreement
 Wafa Bank
 Marjane
 Tangier Exportation Free Zone
 Water supply and sanitation in Morocco

Education

 Al Akhawayn University
 University of Al Karaouine
 École Hassania des Travaux Publics
 ISCAE

 Ben Youssef Medrassa
 École Normale Hébraïque
 Lycée Lyautey (Casablanca)

 Mohammed V University
 Mohammed V University at Agdal
 Mohammed V University at Souissi
 Rabat American School
 The American School of Tangier
 Bibliothèque Générale et Archives
 Sup De Co Marrakech

Food

 Argan
 Charmoula
 Couscous
 Harira
 List of Moroccan dishes

 Moroccan tea culture
 Pastilla
 Ras el hanout
 Tajine

Geography

 Atlas Mountains
High Atlas
Sahara
 Cape Juby
 Cape Spartel
 Chellah

 Lixus (ancient city)
 Rif Mountains
 Tamuda
 Lake Tiguelmamine
 Todra Gorge
 Volubilis
 Zaër Rommani

History

 Algeciras Conference
 Ameziane museum
 Army of Liberation
 Battle of Alcazarquivir
 Battle of Azamor
 Battle of Marrakech
 Battle of Tondibi
 Berber Dahir
 Goumier
 Grands Caids
 Greater Morocco

 History of republicanism in Morocco
 First Moroccan Crisis
 French Morocco
 Colonial Heads of French Morocco
 Colonial Heads of Spanish Morocco
 Green March
 Ifni War
 Kingdom of Nekor
 Moroccan-American Treaty of Friendship
 Republic of the Rif

 First Rif War
 Third Rif War
 Sand War
 Second Moroccan Crisis
 Spanish Morocco
 Tangier Crisis
 Tangier Protocol
 Treaty of Fez
 History of Western Sahara
 Years of Lead

Human rights

 Conseil Consultatif des Droits de l'Homme
 Gay rights in Morocco
 Mudawana
 Al Wifaq
 Association Marocaine des Droits de l'Homme

 Royal institute of the Amazigh culture
 Makhzen
 Tazmamart
 Years of Lead

Languages

 Atlas languages
 Moroccan Arabic
 Berber languages
 Ghomara language
 Judeo-Berber language

 Riff languages
 Senhaja de Srair language
 Atlas languages
 Riffian language
 Shilha language

Media

 List of newspapers in Morocco
 2M TV
 Assahifa Al Ousbouia
 Attajdid
 Le Journal Hebdomadaire

 Maghreb Arab Press
 Médi 1
 Morocco Times
 Organisme de Justification de la Diffusion
 Tel Quel magazine
  Morocco Board News

Military

 Harry Aubrey de Maclean
 Black Guard
 Marche Verte
 Military of Morocco
 Moroccan Royal Guard
 Order of Ouissam Alaouite
 Royal Moroccan Air Force
 Sand war

Politics

 Baker Plan
 Royal Advisory Council for Saharan Affairs, known as CORCAS
 Democracy in Morocco
 Elections in Morocco
 Moroccan parliamentary election, 2007
 Foreign relations of Morocco
 Morocco and the European Union
 Human rights in Morocco
 Houston Agreement
 List of political parties in Morocco
 List of United States ambassadors to Morocco
 Makhzen
 Tazmamart

Monarchy
 King of Morocco
 Line of succession to the Moroccan Throne

Constitution

Legislative branch
 Parliament of Morocco
 Assembly of Councillors
 Assembly of Representatives of Morocco

Executive branch
 Heads of Government of Morocco
 Prime Minister of Morocco

Judicial branch

 Moroccan Dahir

Religion
 Amir al-Muminin
 Church of Saint Andrew, Tangier
 Christianity in Morocco
 Hassan II Mosque
 History of the Jews in Morocco
 Islam in Morocco
 Koutoubia Mosque
 Roman Catholicism in Morocco
 Habous
 Women Religious Leaders in Morocco.

Science and technology
 Casablanca Technopark

Society
 Culture of Morocco
 Mudawana
 Royal institute of the Amazigh culture
 Al Wifaq
 Association Marocaine des Droits de l'Homme
 Moroccan nationality law
 Public holidays in Morocco

Ethnic groups in Morocco

 :Category:Ethnic groups in Morocco
 :Category:Arab tribes in Morocco 
 :Category:Berber Moroccans
 Template:Arab tribes of Morocco
 Template:Berber tribes of Morocco
 Berbers
 Arab-Berbers
 Maghrebi Arabs
 Arabized Berber
 History of the Jews in Morocco
 Romani people in Morocco
 Maghrebis

People

Sports and games

Football
 Royal Moroccan Football Federation
 GNF 1
 GNF 2
 Moroccan Cup
 Morocco national football team
 Moroccan football league system
 Morocco women's national football team

Formula 1
 Moroccan Grand Prix

Golf
 Moroccan Open

Marathons
 Marathon des sables

Olympics
 Morocco at the 1972 Summer Olympics
 Morocco at the 1984 Summer Olympics
 Morocco at the 1992 Summer Olympics
 Morocco at the 1996 Summer Olympics
 Morocco at the 2000 Summer Olympics
 Morocco at the 2004 Summer Olympics

Rugby
 Fédération Royale Marocaine De Rugby
 Morocco national rugby league team

Tennis
 GP SAR La Princess Lalla Meryem

Kickboxing
Ibrahim El Boustati

Territory
 International Court of Justice Advisory Opinion on Western Sahara
 Plaza de soberanía
 Prefectures and provinces of Morocco
 Rif
 Southern Provinces
 United Nations Mission for the Referendum in Western Sahara
 Western Sahara

Terrorism
 2003 Casablanca bombings
 2007 Casablanca bombings
 Moroccan Islamic Combatant Group
 Nadim al-Maghrebi

Transport

 Autoroutes du Maroc
 Air Atlas Express
 Al Massira Airport
 Atlas Blue
 Borac Laraki

 Compagie de Transports au Maroc
 Fulgura
 Jet4You
 Laraki
 Menara International Airport
 Mohammed V International Airport

 Moroccan expressways
 ONCF
 ONDA
 Port of Casablanca
 Royal Air Maroc
 Saïss Airport

Not classified (so far) 
 1960 Agadir earthquake
 American Legation, Tangier
 Bahia Palace
 El Badi Palace
 Flag of Morocco
 Forbes Museum of Tangier
 Groupes urbains de sécurité
 Hymne Chérifien
 Majorelle Garden
 Marrakech Museum
 Mechouar
 Morocco orange tip
 Saadian Tombs
 Morocco (Epcot)
 List of administrative divisions of Morocco by area
 List of administrative divisions of Morocco by population
 List of indoor arenas in Morocco

See also

Lists of country-related topics - similar lists for other countries

 
Morocco